Jaru, in Iran, may refer to:
 Jaru, Alborz
 Jaru, Khuzestan
 Jaru Rural District, in Alborz Province